Amazon Prime Air, or simply Prime Air, is a drone delivery service operated by Amazon. The service uses delivery drones to autonomously fly individual packages to customers, and launched in 2022.

In 2020 the company, along with Zipline, Wingcopter and 7 others was selected by FAA to participate in a type certification program for delivery drones.

History

Concept 
In 2013, Amazon CEO Jeff Bezos revealed plans for Amazon Prime Air in an interview on 60 Minutes. The Amazon Prime Air team worked with NASA and Single European Sky ATM on trials using the Amazon air traffic management system. For additional safety, drones will fly at low altitudes (below 400 feet). There are no roads or fixed routes so there are many more options to get from point A to point B, which makes navigating a drone through the air very different from driving a car on a road. Amazon claims their traffic management system is easy to use for various operators in the same airspace because it will connect via the internet.

As of 2022, the cost for a single drone delivery in Amazon's ongoing US trials was at least $484, which the company anticipated to reduce to $63 by 2025 - still almost 20 times as high as its average ground delivery cost. At the time, customers participating in the trials were required to install a physical marker in their backyard to specify the drop-off location, and to designate a person responsible for observing the drone's flight path. The drones cost $146,000 to build per unit, and had a reach of five kilometers.

United States regulations and testing under waiver program
In the FAA Modernization and Reform Act of 2012, Congress issued the Federal Aviation Administration a deadline of September 30, 2015 to accomplish a "safe integration of civil unmanned aircraft systems into the national airspace system." In August 2016 commercial use of UAV technology was legalized by the United States Congress.

In March 2015, the FAA granted Amazon permission to begin U.S. testing of a prototype under a waiver to the then regulations. Amazon reported that the vehicle cleared for use was obsolete. In April 2015, the FAA allowed Amazon to begin testing current models. In the interim, Amazon had begun testing at a Canadian site close to the United States border.

Current U.S. regulations required drones fly no higher than 400 ft. (122 m), no faster than 100 mph (161 km/h), and remain within the pilot's line of sight. Amazon has stated it intends to move towards operating above 200 ft. (61 m) and beneath 500 ft. (152 m). Amazon has stated it plans to fly drones weighing up to 55 lbs. (25 kg) within a 10 mi (16 km) radius of its warehouses, at speeds of up to 50 mph (80.5 km/h) with packages weighing up to 5 lbs. (2.26 kg) in tow.

In June 2019, the FAA granted Amazon Prime Air a Special Airworthiness Certificate for training and research of its MK27 drone. In August 2020, the company received an FAA Part 135 air carrier certificate. The same year, Amazon began trials in several rural areas in Oregon and California, which were still ongoing as of April 2022, with about 30 different products available for delivery.

Tests in Cambridge, England 
Amazon has patented a beehive-like structure to house delivery drones in cities, allowing Amazon to move from large single-story warehouses that temporarily store packages before they are shipped. Fulfillment centers designed to accommodate drone deliveries and operations within a certain radius are currently required.

On December 7, 2016, Amazon successfully delivered a Prime Air parcel to Cambridge, England from a fulfillment center in the Cambridge area. Amazon posted a video of the delivery on their official YouTube channel, later that month. Also in December 2016, Amazon began its first publicly available trial of Amazon Prime Air to those within several miles of Amazon's depot in Cambridge.

Self-driving cars 
Autonomous vehicles also fall under the Prime Air division's responsibility. In 2017, Amazon was granted a patent for a method that would allow autonomous cars to deal with reversible lanes by receiving information from a central management system.

Upcoming launch in Lockeford, California 
On June 13, 2022, Amazon announced that they would be delivering products using Prime Air drones to customers residing in the small town of Lockeford, California. The announcement did not provide a specific launch date other than "later this year", as Amazon was still awaiting permission from the FAA and Lockeford officials.

Launch in College Station, TX 
College Station City Council approved a zoning change to allow Amazon to put its Prime Air facility in July 2022. The Amazon Prime Air facility in College Station, Texas, in addition to Lockeford, California announced it was ready to begin Prime Air deliveries in a press release on Dec 23, 2022.

See also
 Wingcopter 
Wing (company)
Zipline (drone delivery)

References 

 Amazon (company)
unmanned
 Logistics companies of the United States